The splendid perches are a small family, Callanthiidae (about 14 species), of marine fishes in the order Perciformes. The family is largely restricted to the Indian and Pacific Oceans; the only species found outside these regions are Callanthias legras of the southeast Atlantic, and C. ruber of the East Atlantic and Mediterranean. These brightly coloured fishes are found in relatively deep waters; some species of Callanthias are the only to occur at depths within reach in normal scuba diving. As suggested by the scientific name Callanthiidae, they show some resemblance to anthias (subfamily Anthiinae, family Serranidae).

References